Ira Thompson may refer to:
 Ira B. Thompson (1889–1973), politician, Ku Klux Klan leader, and attorney
 Ira F. Thompson (1885–1937), Associate Justice of the Supreme Court of California